Interstate '82 is a vehicular combat video game developed and published by Activision for Microsoft Windows in November 1999.

Setting
The game is set in the Southwestern United States in an alternate version of the year 1982, during the Reagan Administration. The game is less complex than its predecessor, Interstate '76, lacking the detailed armor and weapon management of the original. Its play-style is closer to console-based vehicular combat games like Twisted Metal, with a single health bar displaying both armor and chassis strength, as opposed to '76s armor/chassis strength system.  The vehicle models have been updated to reflect the change in era, and overall, the game has a new wave feel, with several hitherto-unreleased Devo songs being on the soundtrack, as opposed to the first game's funk-inspired style.

Interstate '82 features a story-mode like its predecessor, with one new option: the player can exit one vehicle and enter another, adding some strategy to the game's storyline.  Another new addition is the ability to skin the new vehicle models.

Reception

The game received a bit more mixed reviews than the original according to the review aggregation website GameRankings. Eric Bratcher of NextGen said, "Some of the '80s nods may be missed by those who weren't paying attention back then, but the game is still fun."

References

External links
 

1999 video games
Activision games
Multiplayer and single-player video games
Vehicular combat games
Video game sequels
Alternate history video games
Video games featuring black protagonists
Video games scored by Josh Mancell
Video games set in 1982
Video games set in the United States
Windows games
Windows-only games
Video games developed in the United States